The National Medical Challenge Bowl is a competition coordinated by Max Yakimov from the Student Academy of the American Academy of Physician Assistants.

The competition is held during the AAPA's Annual PA Conference and the event is organized in a medical quiz bowl-style. Forty-eight teams, with three PA students to a team, compete to answer medical-related questions.  Questions are asked on a variety of subjects including physical diagnosis, microbiology, anatomy, OB/GYN, pulmonary, cardiology, primary care, emergency medicine, and surgery.   Only AAPA student members currently enrolled in an accredited Physician Assistant program which has a registered student society are eligible to participate.

History
The Challenge Bowl started at the 1991 AAPA Annual Conference in San Francisco, CA.  It has been held as an annual event at the conference every year since.  Several states have followed this tradition and hold annual state competitions which are molded after the same format as the national competition.  The competition is one of the most anticipated events at every Annual Conference.  Several students of the various schools participating often attend the event and it is also very popular among the participants of the Conference as they go to cheer on their alma mater.

Format and Rules of Competition
Teams play in a round-robin format; with preliminary rounds, semi-final rounds and one final round.
The moderator reads the questions, the first team to buzz in is acknowledged by the moderator and permitted 10 seconds to answer.

The moderator does not complete the question if a team buzzes in before the full question is read.
If the team that buzzes in answers incorrectly, the moderator re-reads the question and then allows other team(s) an opportunity to respond. Ten seconds are allowed for response and only one response per team is accepted after a team has buzzed in.

The team with the most points at the end of the round advances to the next round. The team with the most points at the end of the final round is declared the winner. In the event of a tie between the two highest scoring teams in the round, a "sudden death" playoff is held and the team to correctly answer a question wins the round. If the team answers incorrectly, the other team wins.

Ten points are awarded for each question answered correctly. Ten points are deducted for each incorrect response. If a team buzzes in and then fails to answer, it is counted as an incorrect response.
Team members must speak loudly and clearly into the microphone. If the moderator questions the pronunciation of an answer, they may request the team to spell the word in question. If the spelling is correct, points are awarded. If the pronunciation and spelling are ruled incorrect, points are deducted.

Past Champions

|}

External links
 AAPA-Challenge Bowl Website

Student quiz competitions
Medical competitions
Education competitions in the United States
Science events in the United States